Rock n Roll Jesus is the seventh studio album by Kid Rock, released on October 9, 2007. Rob Cavallo co-produced the album with Rock. The album was not available at the iTunes Store in an act of protest by Kid Rock regarding a royalties dispute. It was nominated for two Grammy Awards for Best Rock Album and Best Male Vocal Performance for "All Summer Long" at the 2009 Grammy Awards. "All Summer Long" from the album was named the official theme song for WWE Backlash 2008 as well as "So Hott" for WrestleMania XXV and "New Orleans" for WrestleMania 34.

Musical style
The album features the vocals of golfer John Daly on "Half Your Age" and the rock hit "All Summer Long" which has brought the album to triple platinum status in the U.S. and in Canada. "Sugar" is the only song on the album that features rapping vocals. This would be the last album that Rock raps on until 2017's Sweet Southern Sugar.

Singles
The album's first two singles, "So Hott" and "Amen", both did relatively well on the Mainstream Rock and Modern Rock charts. On the Mainstream Rock chart, the singles peaked at No. 2 and No. 11, respectively—the former one becoming the biggest rock hit of his career. The tracks peaked at No. 13 and No. 27, respectively, on the Modern Rock chart.

The album's third single, "All Summer Long", was a massive worldwide hit. It peaked at No. 23 on the Hot 100 chart, despite Rock boycotting iTunes and receiving minimum digital downloads, and No. 4 on the country chart. It went to number one on charts in eight countries across Europe and Australia. "Roll On" and "Rock n Roll Jesus" were released at the same time as follow ups to "All Summer Long". "Roll On" failed to chart in the U.S. but reached No. 59 in Germany and No. 67 in Austria. "Rock n Roll Jesus" peaked at No. 34 on the U.S. Mainstream Rock chart.

The album's sixth single, "Blue Jeans and a Rosary", was released in January 2009. It would peak at No. 50 on the U.S. Country Chart. "Lowlife (Living the Highlife)" was released as the album's seventh single on March 8, 2009.

Critical reception
Rock n Roll Jesus has received mixed reviews from critics. The album has a score of 63 on Metacritic, based on 12 reviews. Rolling Stone gave the album 4 out of 5 stars, stating "His good-hearted faith in rock & roll delivers a powerful kick. As he well knows—and Rock N Roll Jesus proves—roaring guitars, truckloads of attitude and an unquenchable lust for life make up for a multitude of sins." Billboard stated "We may be more entertained at times by Rock's extramusical affairs, but the "Devil" should still be given his due as a clever and creative musical force." Allmusic was less enthusiastic, calling it "big, bold, and brainless" and stating, "splashy and silly though it may be, at least it gets the basic sound right, even if it's way too polished and precise."

Commercial performance
The album debuted at number one on the U.S. Billboard 200 chart, selling about 172,000 copies in its first week. It is Kid Rock's first and only album so far to top the Billboard 200. The album rebounded in March 2008 when "All Summer Long" was released as a single climbing back into the Top 10 on the Billboard 200 staying for 17 weeks. It has been certified 3 times platinum by the RIAA and it had sold 3,493,000 copies in the US as of December 2013.

Worldwide the album has sold 5 million copies, and it was certified 2 times platinum in Canada and gold in Germany, Austria and Australia.

Track listing

Bonus tracks

Sample credits
 "All Summer Long" – "Sweet Home Alabama" by Lynyrd Skynyrd (piano outro, guitar solo, guitar hook before chorus), "Werewolves of London" by Warren Zevon (piano)
 "Sugar" – "I'm Bad" by LL Cool J (vocal sample only)

Demos
 "30 Days in the Hole" (Humble Pie cover)
 "Top Billin" (Audio Two cover)

Personnel

Kid Rock – lead vocals, lead guitar, acoustic guitar, banjo, 12 string guitar, rhythm guitar, lap steel guitar, piano, percussion, moog synth, talkbox, turntables, vox organ
Marlon Young – lead guitar, acoustic guitar, bass guitar, mandolin
Jason Krause – guitar
Aaron Julison – bass guitar
Jimmie Bones – piano, organ, harmonica
Stephanie Eulinberg – drums
Larry Fratangelo – conga drums, timbales, wave drum
Billy Powell – piano
David McMurray – saxophone
Dan Dugmore – pedal steel
Rayse Biggs – trumpet
Paul Franklin – pedal steel
David Campbell – string arrangements
Barbara Payton – backing vocals
Sylver Logan Sharp - backing vocals 
Jessica Wagner - backing vocals 
Hershel C Boone – backing vocals
Vinnie Dombroski – drums on "Rock n Roll Jesus" and "So Hott"
Jeff Fowlkes – drums on "New Orleans" and "Lowlife"
Bobby East – slide guitar on "Lowlife"
John Daly – vocals on "Half Your Age"

Charts

Weekly charts

Year-end charts

Decade-end charts

Certifications

References

Kid Rock albums
2007 albums
Albums produced by Rob Cavallo
Atlantic Records albums
Albums produced by Mike E. Clark
Country albums by American artists
Heartland rock albums
Hard rock albums by American artists